BRP Cape Engaño (MRRV-4411) is the tenth ship of the Parola-class patrol vessels of the Philippine Coast Guard.

Design and features
The Philippine Coast Guard clarified that the ship is a law enforcement vessel and is designed to conduct environmental and humanitarian missions, as well as maritime security operations and patrol missions.

The ship was designed with a bulletproof navigation bridge, and is equipped with fire monitors, night vision capability, a work boat, and radio direction finder capability.

The ship will be equipped with communications and radio monitoring equipment from Rohde & Schwarz, specifically the M3SR Series 4400 and Series 4100 software-defined communication radios, and DDF205 radio monitoring equipment. These equipment enhances the ship's reconnaissance, pursuit and communications capabilities.

Construction, delivery and commissioning
BRP Cape Engaño was completed sea trials in Yokohama, Japan and arrived at the Philippine Coast Guard National Headquarters in August 2018.

BRP Cape Engaño was commissioned by the Philippine Coast Guard at Philippine Coast Guard National Headquarters on August 23, 2018, along with BRP Bagacay in a double commission ceremony.

Operational history
In October 2018, the BRP Cape Engaño along with the  assisted in the transfer of passengers of the M/V Super Shuttle 18 which was stranded off the port of Malay, Aklan due to engine trouble. All of the 142 passengers of the M/V Super Shuttle 18 were later safely brought to the Caticlan Jetty Port.

References

See also
 Parola-class patrol vessel
 Philippine Coast Guard

Cape Engaño
2018 ships
Ships built by Japan Marine United